The following is a list of notable deaths in March 2006.

Entries for each day are listed alphabetically by surname. A typical entry lists information in the following sequence:
 Name, age, country of citizenship at birth, subsequent country of citizenship (if applicable), reason for notability, cause of death (if known), and reference.

March 2006

1
Annette von Aretin, 85, German TV personality.
Joëlle Aubron, 46, French member of Action Directe, lung cancer.
Harry Browne, 72, American libertarian writer and presidential candidate for the United States Libertarian Party, amyotrophic lateral sclerosis.
Ronald Anthony Cross, 68, American science fiction writer.
Mack Easley, 89, American politician and judge in New Mexico, former Democratic lieutenant governor of New Mexico (1963—1966).
Alexander Fol, 72, Bulgarian historian of ancient Greece, former Minister of Education.
O. Milton Gossett, 80, American advertising executive, former CEO Saatchi & Saatchi Compton Worldwide.
Edith "Judy" Ingamells, 112, British supercentenarian, oldest Briton.
Johnny Jackson, 54, American singer and musician, former drummer of The Jackson 5, stabbing.
Josef Muskita, 81, Indonesian Olympic sailor
Peter Osgood, 59, English footballer, heart attack.
Jenny Tamburi, 53, Italian actress in 1970s B-movies and casting director of TV-series.

2
Madeleine Cosman, 68, American scholar of medieval Europe.
Leopold Gratz, 75, Austrian politician, former Mayor of Vienna.
Marion Higgins, 112, American supercentenarian, California's oldest person.
Phyllis Huffman, 61, American casting director (Million Dollar Baby, Unforgiven, Mystic River).
Willie Kent, 70, American blues bassist, cancer.
Rachel Mellon Walton, 107, American philanthropist.
Jack Wild, 53, British actor (Oliver!, H. R. Pufnstuf), oral cancer.

3
Ivor Cutler, 83, Scottish humorist, author, singer, and poet.
William Herskovic, 91, Hungarian escapee from Auschwitz during World War II, cancer.
Charlie Hodge, 71, American guitarist and backup singer for Elvis Presley and Graceland resident, lung cancer.
Floyd Gass, 79, American college football coach (Oklahoma State University).
Paul Smith, 77, American actor.
Richard Vander Veen, 83, American politician, former Democratic United States Representative from Michigan (1973–1977), prostate cancer.

4
Ivano Corghi, 83, Italian football goalkeeper and manager.
John Reynolds Gardiner, 61, American children's author, pancreatitis.
Roman Ogaza, 54, Polish football player.
Edgar Valter, 76, Estonian children's book illustrator and cartoonist.

5
Milan Babić, 50, Croatian politician, former leader of the Republic of Serbian Krajina who pleaded guilty to war crimes, suicide.
Richard Kuklinski, 70, American mafia hitman, natural causes.
John Joseph Paul, 89, American Roman Catholic prelate, Bishop of La Crosse (1983–1994).
John Sandusky, 80, American former NFL player and assistant coach, complications from internal bleeding.
Bill Wolski, 61, American football player, melanoma.

6
Anne Braden, 81, American civil rights activist.
Gunnar Halvorsen, 60, Norwegian politician.
King Floyd, 61, American soul singer.
Mubdar Hatim al-Dulaimi, 55, Iraqi general, Major General in the Iraqi Army, shot by a sniper.
Mortimo Planno, 85, Cuban Rastafarian philosopher.
Kirby Puckett, 45, American baseball player (Minnesota Twins) and member of the MLB Hall of Fame, stroke complications.
Dana Reeve, 44, American activist, widow of Christopher Reeve, lung cancer.
Simon Ungers, 49, German-born New York-based architect and artist.
Ruth Weiss, 97, Austrian-Chinese journalist and member of the Chinese People's Political Consultative Conference.

7
Howard Jackson, 54, American martial artist, leukemia.
John Junkin, 76, British actor (A Hard Day's Night), lung cancer.
Ludwik Margules, 72, Mexican theatre director, cancer.
John Joseph McFall, 88, American politician, former Democratic United States Representative from California (1956–1978).
Gordon Parks, 93, American photographer, film director (Shaft), cancer.
Ali Farka Touré, 66, Malian musician, cancer.

8
Sir Brian Barratt-Boyes, 82, New Zealand pioneering heart surgeon, complications during heart valve replacement.
Joseph Burchenal, 93, American oncologist, worked on leukemia treatments.
Teresa Ciepły, 69, Polish athlete, 1964 Olympic track champion.
Giordano Cottur, 91, Italian Giro d'Italia champion.
Ronald Faulds, 83, Australian Olympic diver
George Sassoon, 69, British scientist, author and radio amateur, cancer.

9
Hanka Bielicka, 90, Polish singer and actress.
Dennis Brookes, 90, English cricketer.
Erik Elmsäter, 86,  Swedish athlete, first Swede to compete in both Summer and Winter Olympics.
Péter Halász, 62, Hungarian theatre director, actor, and writer, liver cancer.
Doug Hamilton, 43, American general manager for the Los Angeles Galaxy soccer team, heart attack aboard aircraft.
Steve Henderson, 61-62, American role-playing game designer.
Colin Ingleby-Mackenzie, 72, English cricketer and insurance executive, brain tumour.
Anna Moffo, 73, American singer and operatic soprano, stroke following decade long battle with breast cancer.
John Profumo, 91, British politician, complications following a stroke.
Harry Seidler, 82, Austrian-born Australian architect, leading exponent of Modernism's methodology.
Laura Stoica, 38, Romanian pop rock singer, traffic collision.
John Wilde, 86, American surrealist painter.

10
Rick Huckabay, 60, American basketball coach.
Alberto Migré, 74, Argentine TV screenwriter and producer, heart attack.
Ronald H. Nash, 69, American philosopher.
Jan Wiktor Wiśniewski, 83, Polish football player.

11
Sir Anthony Farrar-Hockley, 81, British soldier and military historian.
Bernie Geoffrion, 75, Canadian professional ice hockey player and coach (Montreal Canadiens, New York Rangers), stomach cancer.
Pauline Gregg, 96, British author, historian and biographer.
Slobodan Milošević, 64, Yugoslav and Serbian politician, former President of the Federal Republic of Yugoslavia standing trial for war crimes, heart attack.
Jesús Rollán, 37, Spanish former water polo goalkeeper, suicide.
Lindsay Shonteff, 70, British horror film director of the 1960s.
Charles M. Tanner, 85, American screenwriter, playwright and founder of Covenant Players, declining health following massive stroke.

12
Nick Barone, 79, American heavyweight and light heavyweight boxer.
Joseph Bova, 81, American actor (Once Upon a Mattress).
Jurij Brězan, 89, Sorbian-German writer.
István Gyulai, 62, Hungarian journalist, General Secretary of the International Association of Athletics Federations.
Jonatan Johansson, 26, Swedish snowboarder, accident during training.
Adi Lev, 52, Israeli actress and voice actress, cancer.
Victor Sokolov, 59, Russian-American former dissident Soviet journalist and Orthodox priest, lung cancer.

13
Robert C. Baker, 84, American agricultural scientist, developed chicken products and processes.
Roy Clarke, 80, Welsh footballer for Manchester City & Wales.
Jimmy Johnstone, 61, Scottish football player, voted Celtic's best ever, motor neurone disease.
Paul Pineau, 82, French cyclist.
Maureen Stapleton, 80, American actress (Reds, Plaza Suite, Cocoon), Oscar winner (1982), chronic obstructive pulmonary disease.
Peter Tomarken, 63, American game show host (Press Your Luck), plane crash.

14
Ephraim Anderson, 94, British microbiologist.
Ann Calvello, 76, American roller derby player, liver cancer.
Hamish Gray, Baron Gray of Contin, 78, Scottish politician and life peer, former British Conservative government minister.
Lennart Meri, 76, Estonian politician, writer, film director and statesman, former President of Estonia.
Art Michaluk, 82, American Hockey League hockey player and World War II veteran.

15
Ken Brewer, 64, American Poet Laureate of Utah, pancreatic cancer.
Humphrey, c. 17, British Chief Mouser to the Cabinet Office, (1989–1997).
George Mackey, 90, American mathematician, formerly Landon T. Clay Professor of mathematics, Harvard University.
Charles Newman, 67, American novelist (White Jazz, The Promisekeeper: A Tephramancy) and editor (TriQuarterly).
Georgios Rallis, 87, Greek conservative politician, former Prime Minister of Greece (1980–1981), heart failure.
Mark Southern, 45, British professor of linguistics, Middlebury College.
Red Storey, 88, former Canadian Football League player and NHL referee.

16
Jonathan Delisle, 28, American Hockey League and National Hockey League hockey player, automobile accident.
David Feintuch, 61, American science fiction author, following cardiac trouble.
Paul Flaherty, 42, American computer scientist, web indexing pioneer, heart attack.
James "Speedy" Hill, 95, British Army officer, commander of the 3rd Parachute Brigade 1943–1945, natural causes.
K. Leroy Irvis, 86, American politician, Speaker of Pennsylvania House of Representatives (first African-American Speaker in any U.S. state government), cancer.
Moira Redmond, 77, English actress, heart attack.
Jade Snow Wong, 84, Chinese author and ceramicist, natural causes.

17
Yuan Baojing, 40, Chinese multi-millionaire, executed by lethal injection for ordering a contract killing.
Oleg Cassini, 92, American fashion designer.
Narvin Kimball, 97, American banjo player, founding member of the Preservation Hall Jazz Band and the Gentlemen of Jazz.
Ray Meyer, 92, American men's collegiate basketball coach, former DePaul basketball coach and member of the Basketball Hall of Fame, natural causes.
G. William Miller, 81, United States Secretary of Treasury from 1979 - 1981 under Jimmy Carter, idiopathic pulmonary fibrosis.
Bob Papenbrook, 50, American voice actor, lung complications.

18
Michael Attwell, 63, British actor.
Bill Beutel, 75, American television reporter, journalist and WABC-TV anchorman, Alzheimer's disease.
Betty Jane Cornett, 73, American baseball player (AAGPBL)
Nelson Dantas, 78, Brazilian actor, lung cancer.
Anatoliy Puzach, 65, former Soviet World Cup footballer and title-winning coach of Dynamo Kiev.
Sir Wallace Rae, 92, Australian Queensland politician.

19
Mohammad Ali, 78, Pakistani actor, cardiac arrest.
Golap Borbora, 80, Indian politician, Chief Minister of Assam.
Anselmo Colzani, 87, Italian operatic baritone.
Nicholas R. Cozzarelli, 67, American molecular and cell biologist, science journal editor, Burkitt's lymphoma.
Leon Daniel, 74, American correspondent and editor for United Press International.
Channing Pollock, 79, American magician, complications of cancer.
Richard Root, 68, American epidemiologist, crocodile attack.
John Wyatt, 81, British writer and ranger.

20
Bernard Gosselin, 71, Canadian film director.
Gene Scott, 68, American tennis player and publisher of Tennis Week.
Chris Tame, 56, British political activist, bone cancer.
P. R. Wallace, 90, Canadian theoretical physicist.

21
Desmond Ackner, Baron Ackner, 85, British jurist, Lord of Appeal.
Bob Delegall, 60, American actor and director, prostate cancer.
Margaret Ewing, 60, Scottish nationalist politician, breast cancer.
James O. Freedman, 70, American educator and academic administrator, former president of Dartmouth College and the University of Iowa, non-Hodgkin lymphoma.
Bernard Lacoste, 74, French clothing magnate of Lacoste, unspecified illness.
Leslie MacMitchell, 85, American runner, James E. Sullivan Award winner.
Richard Usborne, 95, British author and journalist.

22
Ria Beckers, 67, Dutch politician, former political leader of the Dutch political parties Politieke Partij Radicalen and GroenLinks.
James Chikerema, 80, Zimbabwean nationalist, co-founder of ZAPU and government co-minister in the internal settlement government of Rhodesia.
Pierre Clostermann, 85, French World War II flying ace.
Eugene Landy, 71, American psychologist, famous for treating Brian Wilson, lung cancer.
Britt Lomond, 80, American actor (Zorro), fencer, and World War II veteran.
Gergely András Molnár, 108, Hungarian World War I veteran, one of the last Hungarian World War I veterans.
Brian Parkyn, 82, British Labour MP for Bedford (1966–1970).
Stig Wennerström, 99, Swedish Air Force Colonel convicted of spying for the USSR.
Sir Henry Yellowlees, 86, British Chief Medical Officer (1973–1984).

23
Adwaita, 255 (approximate age), tortoise claimant for world's oldest animal, reputedly a former pet of General Clive, liver failure.
David B. Bleak, 74, American soldier, Medal of Honor recipient in the Korean War.
Sarah Caldwell, 82, American opera conductor, impresario, and stage director, longtime conductor of the Opera Company of Boston.
Desmond Doss, 87, United States Army corporal, Medal of Honor recipient and conscientious objector.
Gerry "Tex" Ehman, 73, Canadian-born retired NHL player and executive, lung cancer.
Harold P. Eubank, 81, American physicist.
Eloy de la Iglesia, 62, Spanish film director.
Pío Leyva, 88, Cuban musician (Buena Vista Social Club), heart attack.
Peter Shand Kydd, 80, English wallpaper heir and stepfather of Diana, Princess of Wales.
Cindy Walker, 87, American country-western songwriter, (Dream Baby) for Roy Orbison et al.

24
Jörg Bastuck, 36, German rally car co-driver, accident during the 2006 Rally Catalunya.
John Glenn Beall, Jr., 78, American politician, former Republican Senator from Maryland (1971–1977) and United States Representative (1969–1971).
Jaroslava Moserová, 76, Czech senator, ambassador, presidential candidate, doctor, and translator.
Lynne Perrie, 74, English actress (Coronation Street, Queenie's Castle, Kes), stroke.
Norman Pounds, 94, English geographer and historian
Carl J. Seiberlich, 84, American naval aviator.

25
Bob Carlos Clarke, 55, Irish photographer, suicide.
Gary du Plessis, 31, Zimbabwean cricketer (Mashonaland, Mashonaland A).
Rocío Dúrcal, 61, Spanish singer and actress, uterine cancer.
Richard Fleischer, 89, American film director (Tora! Tora! Tora!, 20,000 Leagues Under the Sea, Soylent Green).
Danilo Lazović, 56, Serbian actor, heart attack.
Buck Owens, 76, American country music star (Hee Haw), heart attack.
Alfredo Silipigni, 74, American longtime conductor of the New Jersey State Opera, complications of pneumonia.

26
Angelo d'Arrigo, 44, Italian aviator, air crash.
Anil Biswas, 61, Indian politician, cerebral hemorrhage.
David Cunliffe-Lister, 2nd Earl of Swinton, 69, British peer, politician & magistrate.
Paul Dana, 30, American Indy Racing League driver, multiple trauma injuries sustained in accident.
Manar Maged, 2, Egyptian girl born with two heads, brain infection.
Nikki Sudden, 49, British musician, punk-blues icon, and co-founder of Swell Maps.

27
Al Alquist, 97, American politician, former California state senator.
Wayne Boden, 58, Canadian serial killer and rapist, of natural causes after a lengthy illness.
Dan Curtis, 77, American television producer (Dark Shadows, The Winds of War).
Ian Hamilton Finlay, 80, Scottish artist.
Ken Kaess, 51, American advertising executive, CEO of DDB Worldwide, cancer.
Stanisław Lem, 84, Polish science fiction writer, heart failure.
Ruari McLean, 88, British typographer.
Lyn Nofziger, 81, American journalist, conservative Republican political consultant and press secretary for Ronald Reagan.
Ron Schipper, 77, American football coach and college athletics administrator, College Football Hall of Fame Coach.
Bernard Siegan, 81, American law professor.
Rudolf Vrba, 82, Canadian pharmacologist, Auschwitz escapee and contributor to the Auschwitz Protocol, cancer.
Peter Wells, 58, Australian guitarist from rock outfit Rose Tattoo, prostate cancer.
Neil Williams, 43, English international Test cricketer.

28
Wanderley Magalhães Azevedo, 39, Brazilian cyclist.
Jerry Brudos, 67, American serial killer and necrophiliac, natural causes.
Carlos Cat, 75, Uruguayan Minister of Labour (1990–1991) and of Transport (2000–2002).
Pro Hart, 77, Australian outback painter, motor neurone disease.
Bansi Lal, 78, Indian Haryana's four time chief minister, and defence minister of India during Indian Emergency (1975–77).
Charles Schepens, 94, American ophthalmologist known as "the father of retinal surgery" and a Nazi resistance movement leader.
Caspar Weinberger, 88, U.S. Secretary of Defense 1981-1987 under Reagan, Secretary of Health, Education, and Welfare 1973-1975 under Nixon and Ford.

29
Don Alias, 66, American jazz percussionist.
Eric Budd, 84, English administrator, the General Secretary (1987–2000) and Vice-Chairman of The Cricket Society (2000–2001).
Salvador Elizondo, 73, Mexican writer and member of the Academia Mexicana de la Lengua, of cancer.
Henry Farrell, 85, American author and screenwriter (What Ever Happened to Baby Jane?, Hush… Hush, Sweet Charlotte).
Penny Jay, 80, American country singer/songwriter ("Don't Let Me Cross Over", "Just Over the Line"), longtime companion of William Little guitarist (Even Keel) of California, USA.
Gretchen Rau, 66, American set decorator (Memoirs of a Geisha, The Last Samurai, Crocodile Dundee), Oscar winner (2006), brain tumor.
Bob Veith, 81, American racecar driver, former Indianapolis 500 racing driver.

30
Red Hickey, 89, American football player and coach, NFL coach of the San Francisco 49ers, inventor of shotgun formation, natural causes.
Philip Hyde, 84, American wildlife photographer.
Manohar Shyam Joshi, 73, Indian Hindi novelist and soap opera writer.
Harry Krantz, 86, Australian trade union official.
John McGahern, 71, Irish novelist and playwright, cancer.
Gloria Monty, 84, American television producer, executive producer of the soap opera General Hospital, cancer.
Pauli Tavisalo, 78, Finnish Olympic sprinter.

31
George L. Brown, 79, American politician, former Lieutenant Governor of Colorado, first black lieutenant governor in the US.
Olive McKean, 90, American swimmer, swimming coach and Olympic medalist.
Jackie McLean, 73, American jazz saxophonist.
Gerhard Potma, 38, Dutch sailor and Olympian.
Candice Rialson, 54, American actress, liver disease.

References

2006-03
 03